The 1858 Michigan gubernatorial election was held on November 2, 1858. Republican nominee Moses Wisner defeated Democratic nominee Charles E. Stuart with 53.77% of the vote.

General election

Candidates
Major party candidates
Moses Wisner, Republican
Charles E. Stuart, Democratic

Results

References

1858
Michigan
Gubernatorial
November 1858 events